The 2018 Campeonato Paraense Finals was the final that decided the 2018 Campeonato Paraense, the 106th season of the Campeonato Paraense. The final were contested between Paysandu and Remo. 

Remo defeated Paysandu 3–1 on aggregate to win their 45th Campeonato Paraense title.

Road to the final
Note: In all scores below, the score of the home team is given first.

Format
The finals were played on a home-and-away two-legged basis. If tied on aggregate, the penalty shoot-out was used to determine the winner.

Matches

First leg

Second leg

{| width="100%"
|valign="top" width="40%"|

See also
2019 Copa Verde
2019 Copa do Brasil

References

Campeonato Paraense Finals